Melangyna compositarum is a Holarctic species of hoverfly.

Description
External images
Wing length: .The face is narrower and shinier than in Melangyna labiatarum . In males, the sides of the face are almost parallel and the eyes are very slightly hairy. The thorax is shinier than in M. labiatarum male. See references for determination. 
 
 The male terminalia are figured by Hippa (1968) ). The larva is undescribed.

Distribution
Palearctic Fennoscandia South to the Pyrenees and northern Spain. Ireland eastwards through North Europe and Central Europe northern Italy and Yugoslavia. Then East into European Russia and Siberia from the Urals to the Pacific coast (Kuril Islands) Nearctic Alaska South through the Rocky mountains to New Mexico.

Biology
Habitat: Larix, Pinus forests. Arboreal, but descends to visit flowers of white Umbelliferae, Galium, Sorbus aucuparia. The flight period is end May to September (July to September at higher altitudes). The larva feeds on aphids.

References

Diptera of Europe
Taxa named by George Henry Verrall
Syrphinae
Syrphini
Insects described in 1873